Dave Bruce Ballard (born 21 June 1950 in Gulgong), known as Charkey Ramon, is an Australian professional welter/light middle/middle/light heavyweight boxer of the 1970s, and referee of the 1970s and '80s, who won the Australian light middleweight title, and inaugural Commonwealth light middleweight title, his professional fighting weight varied from , i.e. welterweight to , i.e. light heavyweight. Charkey Ramon was managed and trained by Bernie Hall. He was inducted into the Australian National Boxing Hall of Fame in 2008.

Professional boxing record

References

External links

Image - Charkey Ramon
Professional boxing referee record for Charkey Ramon from BoxRec

1950 births
Boxing referees
Light-heavyweight boxers
Light-middleweight boxers
Living people
Middleweight boxers
People from the Central Tablelands
Boxers from Sydney
Welterweight boxers
Australian male boxers
Commonwealth Boxing Council champions